Leon Godfrey Small (June 24, 1903 – November 7, 1979) was a Canadian politician. He served in the Legislative Assembly of New Brunswick from 1960 to 1967 as member of the Liberal party.

References

1903 births
1979 deaths